Dideran (also Romanized as Dīderān; also known as Dīdārān) is a village in Baraan-e Shomali Rural District, in the Central District of Isfahan County, Isfahan Province, Iran. At the 2006 census, its population was 320, in 86 families.

References 

Populated places in Isfahan County